Bald assertion in advertising, sometimes referred to as non establishment claim, is a subcategory of a literally false advertising claim. A bald assertion is a statement used in marketing, advertising or promotions by a company without proof or evidence of truth. An example of such advertising practices is when a company claims their product is the best on the market.

References

False advertising